Bruce Millan  (5 October 1927 – 21 February 2013) was a British Labour politician who served as a European Commissioner from 1989 to 1995.

Early life 

He was born in Dundee and educated at the Harris Academy in that city.

Parliamentary career 
Millan unsuccessfully contested West Renfrewshire in the 1951 general election and Glasgow Craigton in that of 1955.

He was elected as Member of Parliament (MP) for Glasgow Craigton at the 1959 general election and served for that seat, and after its abolition in 1983 for Glasgow Govan, until 1988. He served in the Wilson government of 1964–1970 as Under-Secretary of State for the Air Force from 1964 to 1966, as Under-Secretary of State for Scotland from 1966 to 1970, and in the Callaghan government of 1976–1979 as Secretary of State for Scotland; he subsequently served as Shadow Secretary of State for Scotland under new leader Michael Foot. At the time of the 1981 Labour Party Shadow Cabinet election, the first time Millan won election to the Shadow Cabinet, he was described by The Glasgow Herald as being identified with the "Centre-to-right" of the Labour Party.

After Parliament 
Millan left Parliament in 1988, by applying for the Chiltern Hundreds, in order to take up the post of European Commissioner for Regional Policy and Cohesion, which he held until 1995. The vacancy he left was filled by Jim Sillars of the SNP in the noteworthy Glasgow Govan by-election of 1988.

In 1991, Millan received an Honorary Doctorate from Heriot-Watt University.

Between 1999 and 2001 he chaired the Millan Committee, which proposed reforms to the provision of mental health care in Scotland.

References

External links 
 
 
 

1927 births
2013 deaths
Alumni of the University of Dundee
Association of Professional, Executive, Clerical and Computer Staff-sponsored MPs
British European Commissioners
Deaths from pneumonia in Scotland
Deaths from bronchopneumonia
Honorary Fellows of the Royal Society of Edinburgh
Members of the Parliament of the United Kingdom for Glasgow constituencies
Members of the Privy Council of the United Kingdom
Ministers in the Wilson governments, 1964–1970
People educated at Harris Academy
People from Dundee
Politicians from Dundee
Scottish Labour MPs
Secretaries of State for Scotland
UK MPs 1959–1964
UK MPs 1964–1966
UK MPs 1966–1970
UK MPs 1970–1974
UK MPs 1974
UK MPs 1974–1979
UK MPs 1979–1983
UK MPs 1983–1987
UK MPs 1987–1992